Lend may refer to:

 Lunar Exploration Neutron  Detector, see Lunar Reconnaissance Orbiter

Lend, Austria, a town in the east district of Zell am See in the state of Salzburg
Lend (Graz), a district of Graz
Lend, Iran, a village in Mazandaran Province, Iran

See also
Loan to allow someone to have possession of something on the understanding that it is later returned in the same or equivalent form